Ilchimbetovo (İlsembät) is a rural locality (a selo) and the administrative centre of Ilchimbetovsky Selsoviet, Tuymazinsky District, Bashkortostan, Russia. The population was 1,067 as of 2010. There are 16 streets.

Geography 
Ilchimbetovo is located 12 km northwest of Tuymazy (the district's administrative centre) by road. Bayrakatuba is the nearest rural locality.

References 

Rural localities in Tuymazinsky District